Urbano Noris is a municipality and city in the Holguín Province of Cuba. The municipal seat is located in the town of San Germán.

Geography
The municipality is located southeast of the province, neighboring the provinces of Granma and Santiago de Cuba; and borders with the municipalities of Jiguaní, Cauto Cristo, Cacocum, Holguín, Báguanos, Cueto, Mella, Palma Soriano and Contramaestre. It counts the town of San Germán and the villages of Algodones, Cruce San Francisco, Estrada, Flora, José A. Echeverría, La Caridad, La Ceiba, La Yaya, Las Cuarenta, Paraná, Rey Dos and Santa Cruz.

Demographics
In 2004, the municipality of Urbano Noris had a population of 43,892.

See also
Municipalities of Cuba
List of cities in Cuba

References

External links

Populated places in Holguín Province